Shark is a 2021 Australian comedy short film directed by Nash Edgerton. It was produced by Michele Bennett.

Cast 
Nash Edgerton as Jack
Rose Byrne as Sofie
Krew Boylan as Bridesmaid
Elly Hiraani Clapin as Tourist
Laurence Coy as Jack's Dad
Kieran Darcy-Smith as Captain Rick
Brendan Donoghue as Gary
Vanessa Downing as Jack's Mum
Zumi Edgerton as Flower Girl
Joseph Fala as Island Waiter
Dylan Hare as Bae
Glenn Hazeldine as Celebrant
Mia Healey as Darlin'
Madeleine Levins as Dental Nurse
Hamish Michael as Best Man
Tiriel Mora as Sofie's Dad
Philip Partridge as Tourist
Ioane Saula as Ziggy
Natalie Tran as Dentist

Awards 
Since its launch, the film has been selected in various festivals

References

External links 
 

2021 films
2021 comedy films
2021 short films
Australian comedy short films
2020s English-language films
Films directed by Nash Edgerton